MK-886, or L-663536, is a leukotriene antagonist. It may perform this by blocking the 5-lipoxygenase activating protein (FLAP), thus inhibiting 5-lipoxygenase (5-LOX), and may help in treating atherosclerosis.

References

Indoles
Thioethers
Chloroarenes
Isopropyl compounds
Carboxylic acids
Tert-butyl compounds